Tamerlan Magomedovich Aliev, better known as Timur Aliev (Aliyev), (born September 18, 1973, in Grozny, Chechnya) is a prominent Chechen journalist and the former editor-in-chief of the Grozny-based publication The Chechen Society.

Aliev graduated from Grozny State Oil Institute in 1995.

He has written extensively on the First and Second Chechen Wars and the political situation in the North Caucasus, and has been published in newspaper of records such as Financial Times, The Moscow Times, The Daily Telegraph, and People magazine.

In 2008, Aliev left his job as a journalist to become employed as an assistant of the president of Chechnya Ramzan Kadyrov.

References

External links
Timur Aliev's LiveJournal Page
CV of Timur Aliev
The Chechen Society homepage
Four Corners Interview with Timur Aliev
International PEN Caselist 2004

Interviews
Interview by Four Corners, November 15, 2004
Interview by Facsimile magazine, January 2009

1973 births
Chechen journalists
Chechen writers
Living people
People from Grozny
Russian people of Chechen descent
Chechen people
Free Media Awards winners